TV on the Radio (TVOTR) is an American rock band from Brooklyn, New York, formed in 2001. The band consists of Tunde Adebimpe (vocals, loops), David Andrew Sitek (guitars, keyboards, loops), Kyp Malone (vocals, guitars, bass, loops), and Jaleel Bunton (drums, bass, vocals, loops, guitars). Gerard Smith (bass, keyboards, loops) was a member of the band from 2005 until his death in 2011.

TVOTR has released five studio albums: Desperate Youth, Blood Thirsty Babes (2004), Return to Cookie Mountain (2006), Dear Science (2008), Nine Types of Light (2011), and Seeds (2014), alongside several EPs.

History

The first release from TV on the Radio (initially just founding members Adebimpe and Sitek) was the self-released OK Calculator (the title being a reference to Radiohead's album OK Computer). They were later joined by Kyp Malone and released the Young Liars EP in 2003. This was followed by the full-length Desperate Youth, Blood Thirsty Babes, which earned the band the 2004 Shortlist Music Prize. They released a second EP, New Health Rock, later that year.

The band's second album, Return to Cookie Mountain, leaked in early 2006 and garnered pre-release praise from Pitchfork Media before its official release in July. The record was released in the US and Canada in September on Interscope. Spin magazine named Return to Cookie Mountain its Album of the Year for 2006. The record features guest appearances by David Bowie, Omega Moon, Celebration, Dragons of Zynth, Martin Perna and Stuart D. Bogie of Antibalas, Blonde Redhead, and Yeah Yeah Yeahs' Nick Zinner. Bowie contributed back-up vocals on the song "Province". In promotion of the album, the band performed " Wolf Like Me" on the Late Show with David Letterman, which has garnered over two million views on YouTube. During the US tour, TVOTR performed a few covers with Bauhaus vocalist, Peter Murphy, and Nine Inch Nails frontman, Trent Reznor.

The band's third album, Dear Science, was released on September 23, 2008, on Interscope. It was made available for streaming on their Myspace page and subsequently leaked onto the internet on September 6, 2008. The album was named the best album of 2008 by Rolling Stone, The Guardian,
Spin, The A.V. Club, MTV, Entertainment Weekly, Pitchfork Medias readers' poll, as well as the Pazz and Jop critic's poll. It was also named the second best album of 2008 by NME and the fourth best by Planet Sound.

On September 22, 2008, TV on the Radio performed "Dancing Choose" on the Late Show with David Letterman. They also appeared on Later... with Jools Holland on September 30, 2008, performing "Golden Age" and "Dancing Choose", which were the same songs they performed on Saturday Night Live on February 7, 2009. The band performed "Dancing Choose" again on the February 9, 2009, episode of The Colbert Report.

On September 3, 2009, Tunde Adebimpe announced that TV on the Radio would be taking a year-long hiatus. Guitarist Kyp Malone's solo album, under the name Rain Machine, was released on September 22, 2009, on ANTI-. A solo album by Dave Sitek, Maximum Balloon, was released August 24, 2010, on Interscope, and featured a variety of guest vocals by many of his musician friends, such as Karen O, David Byrne, and both of his TVOTR vocalist bandmates. In addition, Sitek produced Holly Miranda's album The Magician's Private Library, which also featured fellow TVOTR members Jaleel Bunton and Kyp Malone.

In March 2010, Tunde Adebimpe designed a charity t-shirt for the Yellow Bird Project to raise money for Haiti Relief via Partners in Health.

On February 7, 2011, the band announced an end to their hiatus, along with an upcoming fourth album.

Nine Types of Light was released on April 12, 2011, along with a one-hour film under the same name, containing music videos for all the songs on the album, as well as interviews with various New Yorkers. The film was directed by different directors under Adebimpe's supervision.

It was announced in March 2011 that the band's bassist, Gerard Smith, was diagnosed with lung cancer. On April 20, 2011, the band announced Smith's death on their homepage: "We are very sad to announce the death of our beloved friend and bandmate, Gerard Smith, following a courageous fight against lung cancer. Gerard passed away the morning of April 20th, 2011. We will miss him terribly."

In May 2013, TVOTR headlined and curated the All Tomorrow's Parties music festival, held at Pontins holiday camp in Camber Sands, England, at which they debuted the new song "Mercy". They began streaming the studio version of "Mercy" online on July 30, 2013, and released the song for sale at digital music outlets a short time later. They also made the multitracks from "Mercy" available to fans so they could make their own remixes. The next single, "Million Miles", was released digitally a few months later.

On November 8, 2013, via their Facebook page, the band announced they were at work on a new album. They made an official announcement on July 29, 2014, that this new album, titled Seeds, was scheduled for a late 2014 release.

In early 2015, it was announced that TVOTR would perform at the Shaky Knees and Boston Calling Music Festivals in May. On April 9, 2015, the band announced a 2015 North American summer tour to promote the new record. The tour began in May and included a concert at the Red Rocks Amphitheatre on July 27.

Style and influences
TV on the Radio has said that their eclectic music is due to their appreciation for diverse bands, including Bad Brains, Earth, Wind & Fire, Nancy Sinatra, Serge Gainsbourg, Brian Eno, and Pixies. Adebimpe covered the Pixies song "Mr. Grieves" under the TVOTR moniker at the beginning of his career, layering his voice over forty times. The band has also cited Prince's "Purple Rain" as a classic. TV on the Radio have also named post-punk acts Wire and Siouxsie and the Banshees as influences.

Band members

Current members

 Tunde Adebimpe – co-lead vocals, backing vocals, programmer, sequencer (2001–present)

 David Andrew Sitek – lead guitar, programming, sampler, bass, synthesizer, horns, percussion (2001–present)

 Kyp Malone – co-lead vocals, backing vocals, guitar, bass, synthesizer, strings (2003–present)
 Jaleel Bunton – drums, percussion  (2005–present in studio; 2005–2011 live); guitar, Rhodes, organ, synthesizer, backing vocals (2005–present); programming, strings (2008–present); bass (2011–present)

Touring members
 Dave Smoota Smith – trombone, percussion, Mellotron, Moog, bass (2011–present)
 Jahphet Landis – drums (2011–present)

Former members
 Gerard Smith – bass, organ, piano, sampler, programmer, Rhodes (2005–2011)

Former touring members
 Stuart D. Bogie – saxophone (2008–2009)
 Colin Stetson – saxophone (2008–2009)

Discography

Studio albums 
 Desperate Youth, Blood Thirsty Babes (2004)
 Return to Cookie Mountain (2006)
 Dear Science (2008)
 Nine Types of Light (2011)
 Seeds (2014)

References

External links

 
 
 Interscope Records profile
 November 2008 interview at Webcuts
 November 2008 interview with L.A. Record
 Interview with Gerard & Tunde Brooklyn Rail 2008 – contains details of band's formation.
 Kyp Malone discusses his favorite songs with NPR Music

2001 establishments in New York City
4AD artists
African-American rock musical groups
Indie rock musical groups from New York (state)
Interscope Records artists
Musical groups established in 2001
Musical groups from Brooklyn
State University of New York at Purchase alumni
Touch and Go Records artists
Winners of the Shortlist Music Prize